Tricholoma floridanum is a mushroom of the agaric genus Tricholoma. It was first formally described by William Alphonso Murrill in 1945.

See also
List of North American Tricholoma

References

External links
 

Fungi described in 1945
Fungi of North America
floridanum
Taxa named by William Alphonso Murrill